The Swedish Orienteering Federation is the national orienteering association in Sweden. It is recognized as the  national federation for Sweden by the International Orienteering Federation, of which it is a member.

History
The federation was founded on Strömsborg in Stockholm on 6 January 1938. It was among the ten founding members of the International Orienteering Federation in 1961, and Sweden participated in the first European Orienteering Championships in 1962. The 1968 World Orienteering Championships were held in Linköping, Sweden, and in 1971 the Nordic Championships were held in Sundsvall. In 1989 the World Championships were held in Skövde, and in 2004 in Västerås, Sweden.

The Swedish team won the men's relay in the World Championships in 1966, 1968, 1972, 1974, 1976, 1979, 2003 and 2014. The Swedish women's team won the World Championships relay in 1966, 1970, 1974, 1976, 1981, 1983, 1985, 1989, 1991, 1993, 1997 and 2004.

See also
 Swedish orienteers

References

External links
 Information site about orienteering run by the Federation
 The federation's site
 Results of the Swedish Championships

International Orienteering Federation members
Orient
Orienteering in Sweden
Sports organizations established in 1938
1938 establishments in Sweden